Reckless Hearts were a Tasmanian rock band. They relocated to Melbourne and were signed to Glenn Wheatley's label, Emerald City Records. Their extended play, Rain in Spain, featuring the track "This Town" reached the top 100 on the ARIA singles chart. By 2005 they had disbanded with Bruce Holloway and Colin Street forming a country rock duo, Holloway Street. That duo relocated to the United States in the following year. Bruce Holloway died in a traffic accident on 17 April 2009, aged 49.

Members
Bruce Holloway – guitar
Grant Oakford – guitar
Gavin Miles – keyboards
Patrick Cranny – vocals
Colin Street – bass
Peter Manaena – drums
(Paul Hiscutt was the original drummer involved in the major touring and studio recordings)

Discography

Extended plays

References

Tasmanian musical groups
Musical groups with year of establishment missing